Gerhard Pfeiffer (June 14, 1923 – June 27, 2000) was a German chess master and chess problemist.

He tied for 5-7th at Bad Oeynhausen 1941 (8th German Chess Championship, Paul Felix Schmidt and Klaus Junge won); shared 1st with Lothar Schmid at Wiessenfels 1947 (Soviet Zone-ch); shared 10th at Bad Pyrmont 1949 (West Germany-ch, Efim Bogoljubow won); took 2nd, behind Rudolf Teschner, at Düsseldorf 1951 (GER-ch); and took 5th at Sofia 1957 (zonal, Miroslav Filip won).

Pfeiffer won six times for West Germany in Chess Olympiads (1950-1960), and won two bronze medals (team and individual) in the 9th Chess Olympiad at Dubrovnik 1950.

He was awarded the International Master title in 1957.

References

1923 births
2000 deaths
Chess International Masters
German chess players
Chess composers
20th-century chess players